Sooriyan FM  is a privately owned Tamil radio station in Sri Lanka run by ABC Radio Networks started in 1998. It covers the whole island. The network runs sister stations Hiru FM and Shaa FM in Sinhala and Gold FM and Sun FM in English.

About

 Island Wide  -  103.4 MHz,103.6 MHz.

Sooriyan FM rated the number one Tamil radio channel as per the latest Listenership survey.
According to LMRB (Lanka Marketing Research Bureau) ratings Sooriyan FM is continuing to lead the market and audience ratings in the Tamil radio industry in Sri Lanka for the 19th consecutive year.

Sooriyan FM, the Number 01 Tamil channel in Sri Lanka, a member of the Asia Broadcasting Corporation Private limited which is a Rayynor Silva Holdings company.

Sooriyan FM, the 1st private Tamil radio channel in Sri Lanka launched 12 years ago, is the market leader & the trend setter in Tamil radio. Its innovative programming strategy and the up to date news reporting has made Sooriyan FM the epitome in Tamil broadcasting.

Sooriyan FM is, as at now, a multi-award winning Radio Channel in Sri Lanka.

Asia Broadcasting Corporation Private Limited, a part of Rayynor Silva Holdings the owning company of Hiru FM/Gold FM/Sooriyan FM/Sun FM/Shaa FM, set up 12 years ago, revolutionized the Media industry setting up Sri Lanka's First Ever Private Tamil Channel -Sooriyan FM, Sri Lanka's First Ever English Oldies Channel -Gold FM, Sri Lanka's First Sinhala Youth Channel Shaa FM along with Sri Lanka's number one Sinhala radio channel Hiru FM and Sri Lanka's youth English trend setter Sun FM.

The Head Office is situated at the World Trade Centre, and currently occupies the entire 35th Floor in the East Tower of the World Trade Centre, and currently holds the main operations, which includes 8 studios; consisting of 6 broadcasting studios, 1 production studio & 1 dubbing studio; along with the Master Control Room (MCR), the Transmission Rooms for Colombo, the Music Library, News Rooms, and all other offices.

While the main transmitting facility is situated at the World Trade Centre, we also transmit all channels from 6 other locations in the country, ensuring island wide coverage, which also consist of state of the art transmission facilities and equipment, at each location.

The company is managed by Mr. Rayynor Silva, one of the most senior radio personalities in today's broadcasting field in Sri Lanka. His experience of 18 years in the 19-year-old private radio broadcasting Industry has given him an invaluable in-depth insight of the industry. Currently, he is successfully steering Sri Lanka's No. 1 Sinhala radio channel - Hiru FM, the Number 1 Tamil radio channel - Sooriyan FM, the Number 1 English channel – Gold FM, Sri Lanka's hottest English station Sun FM and Sri Lanka's hottest Sinhala station Shaa FM.

He launched the first ever private Tamil radio channel in Sri Lanka - "Sooriyan FM", The first ever English 1970s oldies channel in Sri Lanka - "Gold FM", Sri Lanka's First youth channel Shaa FM, thus revolutionizing the Sri Lankan radio industry.

He was also awarded the highest media honorary title and honorary award of "Vishwa Keerthi Maadya Shoori Jana Prasaada" in honor of the services rendered during the Vanni Humanitarian Operations, last year.

Rayynor Silva was also the youngest President in the history of the IAA (International Advertising Association) Sri Lanka Chapter. It was during his tenure that the Advertising Awards "Chillies" was formed in collaboration with the 4A's.

Satellite
Sooriyan is also available via the Yamal 202 49.0° East satellite.

See also
 List of Tamil-language radio stations

References
 

http://www.hirunews.lk/63693/sooriyan-fm-celebrates-15th-anniversary

External links
 Official website www.sooriyanfm.lk

Tamil-language radio stations in Sri Lanka
Asia Broadcasting Corporation
Radio stations established in 1998